Tristan Caruana (born 15 September 1991) is a Maltese international footballer who plays for Valletta as a midfielder.

Career
Born in Marsaskala, he has played club football for Hibernians, Qormi, Tarxien Rainbows and Ħamrun Spartans.

He made his international debut for Malta in 2018.

International goals
Scores and results list Malta's goal tally first.

References

1991 births
Living people
Maltese footballers
Malta international footballers
Hibernians F.C. players
Qormi F.C. players
Tarxien Rainbows F.C. players
Ħamrun Spartans F.C. players
Valletta F.C. players
Maltese Premier League players
Association football midfielders